The singles discography of Japanese recording artist Akina Nakamori consists of 54 singles and eight promotional recordings.

To date, Nakamori has sold more than 25.7 million records nationwide. She has 22 No. 1 singles and 18 No. 1 albums, being the nineteenth best-selling artist in Japan of all-time.

As lead artist

1980s

1990s

2000s

2010s

Promotional singles

See also

 Akina Nakamori albums discography
 List of best-selling music artists in Japan

Notes

References

External links
 

Discographies of Japanese artists
Pop music discographies